Moose Factory is a community in the Cochrane District, Ontario, Canada. It is located on Moose Factory Island, near the mouth of the Moose River, which is at the southern end of James Bay. It was the first English-speaking settlement in lands now making up Ontario and the second Hudson's Bay Company post to be set up in North America after Fort Rupert. On the mainland, across the Moose River, is the nearby community of Moosonee, which is accessible by water taxi in the summer, ice road in the winter, and chartered helicopter in the off-season (break-up or freeze-up).

A private company also offers freighter-canoe ferry service across the Moose River. As of 2020, the MV Niska 1 ferry was operating between Moosonee and Moose Factory, carrying passengers and vehicles.

The settlement is mainly inhabited by the Cree, but the hospital that provides healthcare services to the people of the island and surrounding area (collectively known as the Weeneebayko Area Health Authority) employs a diverse group of people.

The term "Factory" refers to the jurisdiction of a factor (a business agent or merchant in charge of buying or selling) of the Hudson's Bay Company.

History 

The area was explored by Pierre-Esprit Radisson (an HBC employee) in the winter of 1670/71 from the base at Rupert House. In 1673, Charles Bayly of the Hudson's Bay Company, Governor of the HBC, established a fur-trading post originally called Moose Fort. The property was located on traditional Môsonîw Ililiw (Cree) lands. According to the Government of Canada, the Cree traded furs and also "supplied necessary provisions and labour ... throughout the 1700s".

In addition to trading, the site was also intended to protect the company's interests from French traders to the south. The fort was profitable and had a direct impact on the fur trade in New France. So in 1686, Chevalier de Troyes led a small contingent of French soldiers north on an expedition to raid HBC forts. The English defenders were caught by total surprise and surrendered. The French captured Moose Fort and renamed it to Fort St. Louis.

Ten years later in 1696, the English recaptured it and burned it to the ground. No trace has remained of this original fort.

In 1713, the fort was formally given to the British under the Treaty of Utrecht but it was not reoccupied for almost two decades.

The Hudson's Bay Company set up a new fort in 1730, one mile upstream from the old site, to accommodate Cree traders for whom travel to the other James Bay posts was too dangerous. Five years later, this one also was destroyed by a fire that started in the kitchen, but was rebuilt over a period of seven years.

By the early 1800s, the settlement was the "headquarters for the HBC’s Southern Department".
In 1821, when the Hudson's Bay Company merged with the rival North West Company, there were no longer any serious threats and the post expanded beyond the fort's palisades. Thereafter it came to be known as Moose Factory. It became HBC's main base on James Bay, being the administrative headquarters of the Southern Department. The Governor of Rupert's Land and Council met frequently there to plan for the coming year's operations.

In 1905, the Cree signed a treaty (Treaty 9) with the government that established the Factory Island Indian Reserve. Around the same time, the Parisian furrier company Revillon Frères set up a trading post on the west bank of the Moose River. This post, first known as Moose River Post, grew into the town of Moosonee and provided stiff competition to the HBC Moose Factory post.

Isolated until 1931, the community was finally connected by the Temiskaming and Northern Ontario Railway to Moosonee and it became a service type economy. Supplies could be delivered from the south by train, thereby making redundant the once-yearly sea voyages on which the settlement had previously relied. In 1936, the last supply ship arrived.

After World War II, the Hudson's Bay Company transformed into a retail business, and in 1960 it opened a modern retail store in Moose Factory. The HBC staff house and other historic properties were converted into the open-air museum of Centennial Park that opened in 1967. The HBC continued to operate in Moose Factory until 1987, when its operations in northern Canada, including Moose Factory, were sold to The North West Company. Today, the North West Company operates a grocery and general goods store at the Moose Cree Complex selling "food, as well as general merchandise such as clothing, electronics and housewares" near some of the historic HBC buildings.

Climate
The Moose Factory and Moosonee area has a very cold humid continental climate (Köppen Dfb).

Economy
The economy of the island is based on the healthcare, service, tourism, and construction industries. The largest employer is the Weeneebayko General Hospital, followed by Moose Cree First Nation and Northern Stores.

Northern Stores, G.G.'s and QuickStop are the main stores on the island. "The Complex" is the retail and community centre containing a grocery store (Northern Stores), a restaurant, a Canada Post outlet, a pharmacy, and offices.

Although few people practice a solely traditional lifestyle (i.e. living only off the land), the majority of people still participate in the spring and fall moose hunt. Traditional skills such as preparing and tanning of moose hides as well as the creation of moccasins and moose hide mitts with beading are still practiced today. Other crafts practiced in Moose Factory include the production of tamarack geese, snowshoes, and soapstone carvings which are sold locally.

Political organization
The island is politically divided into two political entities:
 Factory Island 1 (population: 1451) – Indian reserve of  that make up the northern two-thirds of the island, belonging to the Moose Cree First Nation and is governed by an elected Chief, Deputy Chief, and Councilors. In 2005, Patricia Faries-Akiwenzie, a practicing lawyer from Moose Factory, became the first woman to be elected as Chief.
 Unorganized Cochrane District (population: 1007) – Unincorporated southern third of the island, home to the old Hudson's Bay Company post and government services, governed by the provincial Local Services Board and the federal Weeneebayko Health Ahtuskaywin that administers the regional medical facility, Weeneebayko General Hospital.

The Electoral districts include:
 Federally, Moose Factory is part of the Timmins--James Bay electoral district.
 Provincially, Moose Factory is part of the Mushkegowuk—James Bay electoral district.

The Mushkegowuk Tribal Council, a non-profit Regional Chiefs' Council representing eight Cree First Nations in northern Ontario, has its headquarters in Moose Factory.

Attractions and tourism
Notable attractions include the Centennial Park with its 19th-century buildings associated with the Hudson's Bay Company post, Cree Cultural Interpretive Centre,  the Cree Village Eco Lodge and St. Thomas' Anglican Church.  Outdoor tourism in summer and winter, such as trap-line tours, canoe expeditions, and snowmobile trips, are locally provided. The Tidewater Provincial Park is nearby on the adjacent island facing Moosonee. Visitors also take freight canoe tours that leave from Moose Factory or Moosonee downstream to James Bay at the mouth of the river, or upstream to Fossil Island.

Tourism agencies recommend the Polar Bear Express as a "great rail excursion", between Cochrane, Ontario and Moosonee, to view the "hydroelectric dams, isolated homes and perhaps even some wildlife." The train, operated by Ontario Northland, offers passenger and freight service; tickets are sold by phone or at the offices Cochrane, Moosonee, Moose Factory and Timmins. The train will stop on demand in some locations as part of the flag stop service. Service on the Express operates six days a week in summer, and five days per week during other seasons. No meal service is available.

The Lonely Planet guide lists the Polar Bear Habitat & Heritage Village in Cochrane and the Cree Cultural Interpretive Centre as tourist attractions in the Cochrane to Moose Factory & Moosonee region.

Moose Cree First Nation Tourism indicates that available activities from members include boat, island and snowmobile tours, "traditional cooking, fishing (summer and winter)" and HBC historical tours.

Cree Cultural Interpretive Centre 

Cree Cultural Interpretive Centre is an interpretive centre that displays many aspects of Cree culture and crafts.

Cree Eco Lodge

Cree Village Eco Lodge is an eco-tourist lodge with modern rooms and a restaurant; it opened in 2000. Traditional bannock and goose (in season) is prepared in a teepee adjacent to the lodge. From the lodge visitors can see Sawpit Island on the southern side of the canal and Charles Island on the opposite side of the canal.

Boat rides (for a fee) are available out the Moose River to James Bay, or "on fishing and canoeing trips to the Moose River Migratory Bird Sanctuary and the Cree Cultural Interpretive Centre". Other types of boat tours are also available.

Centennial Park 

The Moose Factory Buildings National Historic Site of Canada "consisted of several buildings, of which only the Staff House is at its original location. Built in 1847-50, it is the last surviving fur trade officer’s dwelling in Canada and the oldest building in the James Bay area. The Powder Magazine, built in 1865-66, is situated some distance away on its original location, in what is now Centennial Park."

The 19th-century buildings associated with the Hudson's Bay Company post were designated a National Historic Site of Canada in 1957.

The Moose Factory Hudson's Bay Company staff house was originally the officers' dwelling for HBC doctors, captains, clerks, and secretaries; it is now used as a museum and tourism office. The staff house was built between 1847 and 1850, making it the oldest building in the James Bay area and the last surviving HBC officers' dwelling. Like several other buildings in this National Historic site, the Staff House is a historic listed building, recognized by the Ontario Heritage Trust.

In the Hudson's Bay Company cemetery the oldest tombstone is dated 1802 and marks the grave of the Cree wife and children of John Thomas who was the post's factor at that time. There are only a few graves of British men, since they would return home upon retirement or completion of their contract. In total, 51 graves stones can be found here.

Joseph Turner House is the oldest known surviving servant house of the HBC, built in 1863 and named for HBC trader Joseph Turner (1783-1865), son of an English surveyor and Ojibway wife.

William McLeod House was the carpenter's house built in 1889-90 by HBC carpenter William McLeod. The house, historically listed by the Province and by the federal government, once served as the home for the McLeod family.

Ham Sackabuckiskum House is the only surviving Cree summer home and one of the first balloon-frame construction house in Moose Factory, built in 1926 by the HBC as an incentive to ensure loyalty from Cree trappers. It is also a historically listed building. In the early days, the house was the residence of Sackabuckiskum, a "Cree fur-trapper and HBC affiliate".

The blacksmith shop is the last known surviving HBC blacksmith shop, built in 1849, and was used until 1934.

The powder magazine is the only stone structure, built in 1865, was part of the palisaded warehouse complex. In the early 20th century, it was converted from gunpowder to general storage.

St. Thomas' Anglican Church 

St. Thomas' Anglican Church is a historic Carpenter Gothic style Anglican church built by the Hudson's Bay Company. Construction began in 1864 and was completed in 1885.

Healthcare

In 1949 the Moose Factory General Hospital was built – a $3 million project – as a sanitarium for tuberculosis patients on Moose Factory Island "in order to isolate the disease" in response to a tuberculosis epidemic. It served both First Nations and Inuit patients.

Today the Weeneebayko General Hospital provides medical services as part of the Weeneebayko Area Health Authority to residents of Moose Factory, Moosonee as well as Fort Albany, Ontario, Attawapiskat First Nation, Kashechewan First Nation and Peawanuck First Nation.  The medical staff (consisting of 12 family physicians, 1 anesthetist and 1 surgeon) work with their tertiary care facilities in Kingston, Toronto, Sudbury, and Timmins.

The hospital provides various specialized services:
 24-hour emergency services
 family medicine clinics
 dentistry
 occupational and rehabilitative services
 general surgery and anesthesia
 dialysis
 traditional healing program (with counsellors and traditional healers)
 diabetes education services
 regularly scheduled specialities including: pediatrics, obstetrics/gynecology, geriatrics rheumatology, ophthalmology, rehabilitation and neurology
 diagnostic imaging (x-ray and ultrasound)
 laboratory services

Chartered aircraft "schedevacs" or "medivacs" are used to provide patients with transportation to diagnostic tests (e.g. CT and MRI) and specialize care. Queen's University is the primary university link with many medical students completing placements at the hospital. However, there are also associations with the University of Toronto, McMaster University, University of Ottawa, and the Northern Ontario School of Medicine.

Education 
Moose Factory has three schools:
 Ministik Public School is a public elementary school operated by the Moose Factory Island District School Area Board. The school opened in 1984 and has JK to Grade 8.
 Delores D. Echum Composite School is a senior elementary and secondary school operated by the Moose Cree Education Authority. The school opened in 1997 and has Grades 7 to 12.
 Moose Factory Academy of Christian Education is a private elementary school and opened in 1995.

Some post-secondary programs are provided by Northern College via distant learning (correspondence, video, and web-based courses) or Ontario Learn Courses (web-based). James Bay Education Centre Northern College-Education Complex is a liaison base for the community college.

In Moose Factory, Bishop Horden Memorial School also known as Horden Hall Residential School, Moose Factory Residential School, Moose Fort Indian Residential School (1907-1963), named after Bishop Horden, serving all the communities in the James Bay area, was run by the Anglican Church. The Truth and Reconciliation Commission investigated the school which, like others across Canada, where the highest number of premature deaths among children at these schools was from tuberculosis.

Notable residents 
 Former NHL Ice hockey player Jonathan Cheechoo is a native of Moose Factory.
 Actress, writer, producer, director, and visual artist Shirley Cheechoo was raised in Moose Factory
 Sculptor Duane Linklater was born in Moose Factory

See also

 William Bevan (sloopmaster) – chief factor and commander of Moose Fort in 1732.
 List of unincorporated communities in Ontario

Citations

References

External links

 Moose Cree First Nation – official website

Populated coastal places in Canada
Communities in Cochrane District
Cree reserves in Ontario
Local services boards in Ontario
Moose
Hudson's Bay Company forts
Hudson's Bay Company trading posts
Sanatoria